Mihai Alexandru Dobre (born 30 August 1998) is a Romanian professional footballer who plays as a midfielder for Primeira Liga club Famalicão, on loan from Ligue 2 club Dijon.

Dobre started out as a senior in England with AFC Bournemouth, but only recorded one competitive game and was loaned out several times. In 2020, he moved to French side Dijon on a full transfer.

Internationally, Dobre represented the Romania under-23 team in the 2020 Summer Olympics.

Club career

Early career
Born in Bucharest, Dobre signed for AFC Bournemouth in August 2016 from Viitorul Cluj, and initially linked up with the club’s under-21 squad. 

On 30 August 2017, Dobre moved to League One side Bury on loan until 1 January 2018. He made his English Football League debut for Bury in an away game against Rotherham United, coming on in the 55th minute as a substitute for Jordan Williams. On 18 January 2018, Dobre joined Bury's Lancashire rivals Rochdale on loan until the end of the season. On 11 January 2019, Dobre again moved on loan to EFL League Two club Yeovil Town until the end of the 2018–19 season.

On 4 January 2020, he made his debut for Bournemouth as a substitute in a 4–0 F.A. Cup victory against Luton Town. On 31 January, Dobre joined Wigan Athletic on loan until the end of season.

Dijon
On 12 August 2020, Dobre signed for Ligue 1 club Dijon for a reported fee of £900,000.

Loan to Famalicão
On 8 January 2023, Dobre joined Famalicão in Portugal on loan until the end of the season.

International career 
On 3 March 2023, Dobre received his first official call-up to the Romanian senior national team for the UEFA Euro 2024 qualifying matches against Andorra and Belarus.

Career statistics

Club

References

External links

1998 births
Footballers from Bucharest
Living people
Romanian footballers
Romania under-21 international footballers
Olympic footballers of Romania
Association football midfielders
Bury F.C. players
AFC Bournemouth players
Rochdale A.F.C. players
Yeovil Town F.C. players
Wigan Athletic F.C. players
Dijon FCO players
F.C. Famalicão players
English Football League players
Ligue 1 players
Ligue 2 players
Championnat National 3 players
Primeira Liga players
Footballers at the 2020 Summer Olympics
Romanian expatriate footballers
Expatriate footballers in England
Romanian expatriate sportspeople in England
Expatriate footballers in France
Romanian expatriate sportspeople in France
Expatriate footballers in Portugal
Romanian expatriate sportspeople in Portugal